Aslam Qureshi (3 February 1954 – 6 June 2020) was a Pakistani cricketer. He played in 53 first-class and 18 List A matches for Habib Bank Limited and Karachi from 1969/70 to 1986/87, taking 120 first-class wickets. He also played in local leagues in England, and was later employed by the Pakistan Cricket Board (PCB) as a groundsman in Karachi. He died from COVID-19, aged 66.

References

External links
 

1954 births
2020 deaths
Pakistani cricketers
Habib Bank Limited cricketers
Karachi cricketers
Karachi Blues cricketers
Karachi Whites cricketers
Cricketers from Karachi
Deaths from the COVID-19 pandemic in Pakistan